Pat Adams (born 1928) is an American painter and printer.

Pat Adams may also refer to:

Pat Adams (cycle race organiser), British organiser of cycling events
Pat Adams (baseball), see Rob Richie (baseball)

See also
Patrick Adams (disambiguation)
Patricia Adams (disambiguation)